North Bitchburn is a small village in County Durham, England. In the 2001 census North Bitchburn had a population of 135.

The village has a row of terrace houses named Low Row consisting of 20 houses. There are also estates called Wellgarth Court, North Bitchburn Terrace and Hillside Court. There is one public house, a Methodist chapel and one shop within the village centre. The public house is named 'The Red Lion'.

References

Villages in County Durham
Crook, County Durham